Andrew Dixon may refer to:

 Andrew Dixon (As the World Turns), a character on the American soap opera As the World Turns
 Andrew Dixon (rugby league) (born 1990), English rugby league player
 Andy Dixon (born 1979), Canadian artist and musician
 Andy Dixon (footballer) (born 1968), former English footballer

See also
Andrew Dickson (disambiguation)
 Andrew Graham-Dixon (born 1960), British art historian and broadcaster